Marius Vaščega (born 20 December 1977) is a Lithuanian lawyer and economist and a long-standing official of the European Union institutions.

In February 2022 Marius Vaščega was appointed as head of the European Commission's Representation in Vilnius. In this function, he acts as the official representative of the European Commission in Lithuania under the political authority of President Ursula von der Leyen. Earlier 2019 December - 2022 February He was the head of the cabinet of Virginijus Sinkevičius, the European Commissioner for the Environment, Oceans, and Fisheries.

Biography 
Vaščega was born in Panevėžys, the fifth largest city in Lithuania, where he was raised and graduated from Juozas Balčikonis Gymnasium.

Vaščega graduated from Vilnius University with a master's degree in Law. Marius also studied at Erasmus University Rotterdam, the University of Hamburg, the Complutense University of Madrid and the Centre Européen de Recherches Internationales et Stratégiques, where he obtained master's degrees in law and economics and international relations.

He started a professional career as a lawyer in Lithuania, where he also taught at the Faculty of Law at Vilnius University.

Since 2004, Vaščega has been an official of the European institutions, worked at the Council of the European Union in Brussels, where he advised ten EU Presidencies and worked in the European Parliament.

From 2014 until 2018, he worked as an economic policy officer of the European Commission in Lithuania. In the period between 2018 and 2019 he worked as the Deputy Head of the European Commission Representation in Lithuania and Head of the Policy Department.

Vaščega is active in the media on European topics and is also the author of scientific articles and commentaries.

He is a fluent user of Lithuanian, English, French and Russian languages and also speaks Spanish and German.

Membership 
Vaščega is the Vice-President of the Lithuanian Lawyers Association, was the Chairman of the Brussels Branch of the Lithuanian Lawyers Association.

Notes and references 

Lithuanian officials of the European Union
Lithuanian jurists
University of Hamburg alumni
Vilnius University alumni
Living people
1977 births